Lanni is both a given name and a surname. Notable people with the name include:

Andrew Lanni, Scottish film producer
Arnold Lanni (born 1956), Canadian record producer
Lanni Marchant (born 1984), Canadian long-distance runner
Terrence Lanni (1943-2011), American casino executive

See also
Lanini